Matthew Seligman (14 July 1955 – 17 April 2020) was an English bassist, best known for his association with the new wave music scene of the 1980s. Seligman was a member of the Soft Boys and the Thompson Twins, and was a sideman for Thomas Dolby. Seligman was also a member of Bruce Woolley and the Camera Club and the Dolphin Brothers, and backed David Bowie during his performance at Live Aid in 1985.

Biography

Early life
Seligman was born in Cyprus, and his family moved to the UK eight months after his birth, settling in Wimbledon. Influenced by Paul McCartney, Free’s Andy Fraser, and Tina Weymouth of Talking Heads, he learned bass.

Career
Seligman was a founding member of Bruce Woolley and the Camera Club, which also included his friend Thomas Dolby. He played on the band's 1979 debut studio album English Garden, which featured a version of "Video Killed the Radio Star", which Woolley had co-written with the Buggles. After leaving the Camera Club in 1979, Seligman joined the Soft Boys, replacing founding bassist Andy Metcalfe, and performed on their second studio album Underwater Moonlight. The Soft Boys broke up in 1980, and Seligman next formed the short-lived band the Fallout Club, which also included Dolby. The Fallout Club disbanded after two singles and Seligman joined the Thompson Twins, appearing on their 1982 studio album Set and its American counterpart In the Name of Love. Seligman was fired from the Thompson Twins later that year when the band decided to reduce itself to a trio. Seligman then joined Dolby's solo group, and played bass on his studio albums The Golden Age of Wireless (1982) and The Flat Earth (1984) and the hit single "She Blinded Me With Science".

In addition to his work with Dolby throughout the 1980s, Seligman was also a member of the bands Local Heroes SW9 and the Dolphin Brothers. He also played bass on the first two solo studio albums by his former Soft Boys bandmate Robyn Hitchcock.

As a session musician, Seligman performed on studio albums and singles by Stereo MC's, the Waterboys, Sinéad O'Connor, Transvision Vamp, Morrissey, Nan Vernon, Tori Amos, Kimberley Rew and Alex Chilton. In 1985, Seligman and Dolby appeared as part of David Bowie's backup band at Live Aid. In 1986, Seligman played bass guitar on Bowie's soundtrack album Labyrinth and his single "Absolute Beginners".

In 2002, Seligman played at the Shanghai Festival with Snail, along with Chris Bell and Jonathan Klein, and in 2007 began working with the Fire Escapes. In 2011–12 he contributed to Thomas Dolby's A Map of the Floating City also appearing with him on tours of the UK and northern Europe, at the Blue Note in Tokyo in February 2012 and at the Latitude Festival, Suffolk, England in July 2012. In 2014, with fellow Fire Escapers Mark Headley and Lucy Pullin, he completed the Magical Creatures' Wishing Machine collection, also appearing live with them at a summer 2016 William S. Burroughs-inspired launch party in Brighton, England.

In 2017, Seligman, along with Jon Klein and Australian musicians Paul Cartwright and Paul Smyth released the album Monoplane under the name Neon Sisters. The album features both Seligman and Cartwright on basses, Klein on guitar, Smyth on keyboards with guest appearances by Bruce Woolley and David Bridie.

Seligman played a black Fender Jazz Bass as his first choice instrument. In addition he used an Ibanez with a C-ducer contact mic built into the back of the neck, close to the neck/body junction, for his fretless work primarily with Thomas Dolby, but also Peter Murphy and in the ambient collection Sendai, recorded with Japan/Hong Kong-based musician Jan Linton for the March 2011 Tōhoku earthquake relief fund, and released by Entropy Records in 2012, and re-released in 2020 with extra material after Seligman's death.

Personal life
Seligman was a lifelong Fulham F.C. fan. After a lifetime in the UK, he moved to Sendai in Japan in early 2005 and subsequently, after a four-year spell back in the UK, returned there in July 2012. He then practiced as a human rights solicitor in London and continued to play music until his death. He left behind two children.

Death
In early April 2020, Dolby reported that Seligman had been placed in an induced coma in St George's Hospital, London, after being diagnosed with COVID-19. On 17 April, Dolby posted on his Facebook page that he had suffered a "catastrophic haemorrhagic stroke" from which he was not expected to recover; Seligman died later that day, aged 64.

Discography
Seligman performed on the following albums, either as an official band member or a sideman:

Local Heroes S.W.9 – Drip Dry Zone

with Bruce Woolley and the Camera Club
 English Garden (1979)

with the Soft Boys
 Underwater Moonlight (1980)
 Nextdoorland (2003)

with Robyn Hitchcock
 Black Snake Diamond Röle (1981)
 Groovy Decay (1982)
 Invisible Hitchcock (1986)

with Thompson Twins
 Set (1982)
 In the Name of Love (1982)

with Thomas Dolby
 The Golden Age of Wireless (1982)
 Blinded by Science (1983)
 The Flat Earth (1984)
 Astronauts & Heretics (1992)
 A Map of the Floating City (2011)

with the Dolphin Brothers
 Catch the Fall (1987)

with Jan Linton
 Sendai 仙台 (2012) 
 Sendai 仙台 Special Extended edition (2020) 
 King Hong (2020)

with Snail
 Psychodelicate (2001)
 Last Dog in Space (2002)
with Ajantamusic
 Above the Cloudline (2009)
 The Secret Door (2013)

with the Fallout Club
 "Dream Soldiers" (single) (1981)
 Dangerous Friends (2017)

with Magical Creatures
 Wishing Machine (2016)

with Neon Sisters
 Monoplane (2017)

As a sideman
 Kimberley Rew – The Bible of Bop (1982)
 Alex Chilton – Live in London (1982)
 The Waterboys – This Is the Sea (1985)
 David Bowie – Labyrinth (1986)
 David Bowie – "Absolute Beginners" (1986)
 Peter Murphy – Love Hysteria (1988)
 Transvision Vamp – Pop Art (1988)
 Morrissey – "Ouija Board, Ouija Board" (1989)
 Stereo MC's – Supernatural (1990)
 Sam Brown – April Moon (1990)
 Tori Amos – Little Earthquakes (1992)
 Stereo MC's – Connected (1992)
 Sinéad O'Connor – Universal Mother (1994)
 Nan Vernon – Manta Ray (1994)
 The Popguns – Lovejunky (1995)
 Jan Linton – I Actually Come Back (2016)

References

External links
 
 
 
 Interview along Thomas Dolby, 1982
 Interview
 Discography 

1955 births
2020 deaths
English bass guitarists
English male guitarists
Male bass guitarists
English new wave musicians
Thompson Twins members
Musicians from London
People from Wimbledon, London
The Soft Boys members
Deaths from the COVID-19 pandemic in England
Cypriot musicians